Fontigens is a genus of minute freshwater snails with an operculum, aquatic gastropod molluscs or micromolluscs in the family Hydrobiidae.

Species
Species within the genus Fontigens include:
Fontigens aldrichi 
Fontigens antroecetes 
Fontigens binneyana 
Fontigens bottimeri 
Fontigens cryptica 
Fontigens holsingeri Hubricht, 1976 - Tapered cavesnail
Fontigens morrisoni 
Fontigens nickliniana 
Fontigens orolibas 
Fontigens proserpina 
Fontigens tartarea 
Fontigens turritella Hubricht, 1976 - Greenbrier cavesnail

References

 
Hydrobiidae
Taxonomy articles created by Polbot